Erica carnea, the winter heath, winter-flowering heather, spring heath or alpine heath, is a species of flowering plant in the family Ericaceae, native to mountainous areas of central, eastern and southern Europe, where it grows in coniferous woodlands or stony slopes.

Description

Names
The first published name for the species is Erica herbacea; however, the name E. carnea (published three pages later in the same book) is so widely used, and the earlier name so little used, that a formal proposal to conserve the name E. carnea over E. herbacea was accepted by the International Botanical Congress in 1999.

The Latin specific epithet carnea means "flesh pink".

Cultivation and uses

It is very widely grown as an ornamental plant for its winter flowering; over 100 cultivars have been selected for variation in flower and leaf colour. Unlike most species of Erica, which are typically calcifuges, it tolerates mildly alkaline as well as acidic soils, making it easier to grow in many areas. Like other species within the genus Erica it is often seen as groundcover amongst plantings of dwarf conifers.

The following cultivars, forms and hybrids have gained the Royal Horticultural Society's Award of Garden Merit: 

'Adrienne Duncan' 
'Ann Sparkes'   
'Challenger'
'Eva'  
'Loughrigg' 
'March Seedling'  
'Myretoun Ruby' 
'Nathalie' 
'Pink Spangles' 
'Rosalie' 
'Vivellii' 
'Wintersonne'  
E. carnea f. alba (white-flowered):
'Golden Starlet' 
'Ice Princess' 
'Isabell' 
'Springwood White' 
E. carnea f. aureifolia (golden-leaved):
'Foxhollow'

'Westwood Yellow' 
E. × darleyensis (E. carnea × E. erigena)
'Jenny Porter'

References

External links

 
 ICBN: List of conserved names

Alpine flora
carnea
Plants described in 1753
Taxa named by Carl Linnaeus